The International Lutheran Church (ILC) is the English-speaking congregation of the Ethiopian Evangelical Church Mekane Yesus (EECMY) which meets in the Lidetta section of Addis Ababa, Ethiopia. Although it follows the Lutheran confession and worship, ILC welcomes any Christian worshippers.

History
The first service for the International Lutheran Church was held on December 1, 1957 at the "fifth kilo" Mekane Yesus mother church. It was organized by Dr. Herbert G. Schaefer, the director of the American Lutheran Mission. Services were held on Sunday afternoons since the regular Amharic congregation met in the church building in the mornings. The ILC congregation was officially organized in May, 1958 with eleven adult members from the international community in Addis Ababa. Sunday School classes began in 1959.

In 1960 ILC became a member of the Wollo-Tigre Synod of the Ethiopian Evangelical Church Mekane Yesus. When the Addis Ababa congregations formed their own synod, ILC transferred its membership to the present Central Ethiopia Synod.

In 1961 the present site was purchased. The new church building was dedicated on December 1, 1963, six years after the first service. Rev. Leonard Flachman of ALM chaired the building committee and designed the furniture. Later the pastors’ offices and Sunday School rooms were added. A Day Care Center was built in 1980. Later, the rear of the sanctuary was expanded and more offices were added.

Leadership
The first pastors of ILC were missionaries of the American Lutheran Mission and served part-time, including Dr. Schaefer, Lowel Hesterman, Richard Jensen, Dennis Everson, Robert Avers and Loren Bliese. In the 1960s and early 1970s two volunteer retired pastors, Rev. Fredericks and Rev. Reitz from the USA, served for two years each. Rev. Paul Voltz from Radio Voice of the Gospel also served part-time. In the 1970s and 1980s Rev. Torgny Erling from Sweden, and Rev. Pekka Harne from Finland served basically full-time, and Rev. Johnny Bakke from Norway served part-time in the 1990s. Dr. Philip and Rene Johnson from the Evangelical Lutheran Church in America served form 2000 until 2006 as the part-time pastoral team.  Dr. Peter and Patty Ford from the Reformed Church in America served as part-time pastors from 2006 until 2009. Rev. Ann Staal was ordained at ILC in 2010 through the EECMY, and then served as pastor through June 2012. In August 2012, Pastor Doug Steinke arrived with his family, and took on his ministry until 2014. Since that time ILC has had a pastoral team consisting of several pastors from various countries who share the pastoral duties of ILC. Currently there are 5 expatriates on the pastoral team.

EECMY includes Presbyterian Synods, and besides the Lutheran ministers, Reformed and Presbyterian missionaries have contributed to the ministry and fellowship of ILC. Much of the time, the worship services and work of the congregation have been carried out by volunteers from many denominations.

Amharic congregation
When the church was dedicated in 1963, an Ethiopian evangelist was hired by ILC, and the Amharic speaking Lidetta Mekane Yesus congregation was later organized. Sunday morning hours were divided between the two congregations. The Amharic congregation meets early on Sunday mornings. Other programs during the week are scheduled in cooperation with the two congregations' Councils. The expenses of the compound and utilities have also been shared. During the communist period the Lidetta Congregation outgrew ILC, and continues to carry on a very active ministry.

Membership and Governance
Membership is open to all Christian denominations, and associate membership is offered for those who want to retain their membership in their previous churches. The membership of ILC includes evangelical Christians from all over. The church welcomes visitors from all over the world every Sunday, including many from Scandinavia. The ILC is governed by an elected Church Council of nine members. Council members are elected for two-year terms and may serve unlimited terms. Council elections typically take place in March or April at the congregation's Annual General Meeting (AGM).

Budget and gifts
The expenses of the ILC are met entirely by gifts from members of the congregation and Sunday visitors. Besides support for the Addis Ababa Synod of EECMY, the budget of ILC has included support for many Christian organizations working in Ethiopia, such as Mekane Yesus Seminary scholarships, the Bible Society of Ethiopia, Win Souls for God, and Mother Theresa Orphanage.

Current services and programs
English-language services are held at 11 AM on Sunday morning. On most Sundays there is a Sunday School program for younger children, and a Bible Study class for older children. These classes depend on volunteers within the church. Holy Communion is celebrated the first Sunday of each month during the regular service, and one Sunday a month is a Family Service. Easter sunrise services, Christmas Eve candlelight services, evening worship during Lent, outings for youth, women and men, confirmation instruction, and evening Bible study programs have continued over the years.

Reunion of Lutheran Workers in Ethiopia
A reunion of Lutheran missionaries who served in Ethiopia from 1957 was held in Minneapolis, in June 2011.

See also 
 P'ent'ay
 Ethiopian Evangelical Church Mekane Yesus

Notes

External links
  Church website
  https://web.archive.org/web/20070812131759/http://www.globalgoodnews.org/Churches_in_Ethiopia.htm

Lutheranism in Ethiopia
Churches in Ethiopia
Lutheran denominations
Churches in Addis Ababa